Break Away is a national nonprofit organization that promotes the development of quality alternative break programs through training, assisting, and connecting campuses and communities. The organization has chapters on about 200 college campuses throughout the United States. Break Away holds training sessions for directors at each chapter school, who then train the student leaders and participants. 
An alternative break consists of a group of college students who serve a community with a focus on a specific social issue for a specific amount of time, whether it is a weekend or a week. Most trips are weeklong trips, with the majority over college spring breaks. 60% of trips occur over spring breaks and 15% occur over winter breaks. The social issue pertains to the community to which the group goes. Break Away emphasizes service-learning in which group members learn about the community they will be serving and how to avoid voluntourism. Break Away encourages student leaders, with each trip consisting of student leaders, student participants, a partner organization, and most of the time, a learning partner. By emphasizing the Active Citizenship Continuum and the Eight Components of a Quality Alternative Break, Break Away hopes to produce valuable alternative breaks, which will then lead participants to become more aware and active in their community. Break Away has about 200 chapter schools, more than 500 nonprofit partnerships, and thousands of participants and alumni worldwide. Just in 2014, there were a total of 1,551 trips with over 20,000 participants, which equates to over 1 million hours of service. Of the 1,551 trips in 2014, 1,334 were domestic and 251 were international.

History 
Two students, Michael Magevney and Laura Mann, founded Break Away in June 1991 at Vanderbilt University after the creation of Alternative Spring Break on the campus in 1987. While still at Vanderbilt University, the organization was funded by the chancellor's discretionary fund. In 2000, the organization expanded to Florida State University where it was housed by the Center for Civic Education and Service. In 2007, Break Away headquarters moved to Atlanta, Georgia where it shared a space with Hands On Network/Points of Light, which also had a goal of creating volunteer opportunities but for recent college graduates and alternative break alumni. The growth of Break Away accelerated considerably, around 20%, in the mid-2000s after Hurricane Katrina in the Gulf Coast. In 2010, the organization saw another acceleration, this time in terms of international trips. With the early 2010 earthquake in Haiti, the organization created the Haiti Compact with five American colleges – American University, the College of William and Mary, Indiana University, Loyola Marymount University, and the University of Maryland – which organized trips to the country. The Compact sought to develop the best practice for international alternative breaks, specifically in aiding participants in overcoming potential harm to the community, while also increasing service-learning. The College of William and Mary originally committed to serving in Haiti for four years following the 2010 earthquake, but since they have extended it to eight.  In 2011, Break Away struck out on their own again, although their offices remain in the Atlanta area—and are still cubicle-free.

The organization has an annual budget of $160,000, which is mainly funded through chapter membership dues. Each year, the organization holds about 20 two-day retreats on college campuses to educate on fundraising, conflict resolution, and group building, which are attended by chapter directors and leaders. They also hold Alternative Break Citizen Schools, ABCs, which are weeklong leadership training sessions for students who lead their college’s Break Away chapter.

Active Citizenship 
The Active Citizen Continuum is the driving force behind Break Away. The goal for each person is to become an Active Citizen, which is achieved by going through each of the steps. Every person begins as a Member, someone who is not concerned with their role in social problems. A Member then becomes a Volunteer, someone who is well intentioned but not well educated about social issues, through exposure. That Volunteer starts to get an understanding for a particular social issue and becomes a Conscientious Citizen, someone who is concerned with discovering root causes and asks why. Finally, that Conscientious Citizen begins to take action and becomes an Active Citizen, someone who prioritizes the community and social issue into their values and life choices. The aim for the Active Citizen Continuum is to create citizens that are aware of social issues in the world and who commit to resolving those issues.

Eight Components of a Quality Alternative Break 
All components are equally important in order to create the best alternative break trips as possible.
Strong Direct Service: Trips provide an opportunity for interaction and hands-on activities with a community.
Alcohol and Drug-Free: This allows for group cohesion and development.
Diversity and Social Justice: Not only do the communities in which the trips will occur embody diversity, the students who make up the groups do as well. 
Orientation: Before leaving for their trip, each group discusses the issue and learns about the community and the organization that they will be working with.
Education: To go along with the emphasis of service-learning, members are educated on the social issue of their community and how their community and lives are associated to it as well.
Training: Members learn basic skills to complete the tasks given to them by the organizations they work with in the community, such as learning how to use a handsaw.
Reflection: This piece occurs during the trip, when leaders and members are encouraged to discuss their experiences to promote group cohesion and understanding.
Reorientation: This piece occurs after the trip, in which group members are encouraged to take what they learned from their experiences on their trip and put them into place in their own community by finding organizations that relate to the social issue of their trip.

Voluntourism 

One of Break Away’s goals is to avoid voluntourism or volunteer tourism, which is a form of tourism in which travelers participate in volunteer work. By incorporating the service-learning aspect of alternative breaks, participants are able to learn about the community they will be serving prior to their arrival, which decreases the chances of tourism. Voluntourism can have the opposite effect of its intended purpose of helping a community, instead, it has been shown to generate potential harm to a community. For instance, in an orphanage in Cambodia, the presence of wealthy volunteers has slowed the market for adopting the orphans in the town. Through Break Away, participants are able to learn about the culture and the social issues within a specific community before their departure, which allows them to understand the community better.

Membership 
With around 200 chapters countrywide, Break Away has two levels of membership. The first level of membership is Associate, which has an annual fee of $350 and includes SiteBank access, ongoing Break Away consultation, access to resources, listing as an Associate Chapter, forum access, and 10% discount on trainings and products. The highest level of membership is Advantage, which is $700 per year and includes everything that Associate offers, as well as listing as an Advantage Chapter, 20% discount on trainings and products and one free Alternative Break Citizen School registration.

References

"Office of the Chancellor". Vanderbilt University. Accessed February 18, 2015.
Straus, Tamara. "Creating Engaged Citizens (SSIR)". Creating Engaged Citizens. January 1, 2011. Accessed February 18, 2015.
Piacitelli, Jill, Molly Barwick, Elizabeth Doerr, Melody Porter, and Shoshanna Sumka. "Alternative Break Programs: From Isolated Enthusiasm to Best Practices The Haiti Compact." Journal of Higher Education Outreach and Engagement 17. Accessed February 18, 2015.
. William & Mary - W&M Haiti Compact. Accessed February 18, 2015. 
Dictionary.com. Accessed February 18, 2015.
Stupart, Richard. "Does 'voluntourism' Do More Harm than Good?" CNN Travel. July 31, 2013. Accessed February 18, 2015.

External links
 

1991 establishments in Tennessee
Non-profit organizations based in the United States
Volunteering in the United States
Virginia Tech